Warczewiczella is a genus of orchids native to South America, Central America, and Cuba.

Warczewiczella amazonica Rchb.f. & Warsz. - Colombia, Ecuador, Peru, Brazil
Warczewiczella candida (Lindl.) Rchb.f. - Brazil
Warczewiczella discolor (Lindl.) Rchb.f. - Colombia, Ecuador, Peru, Venezuela, Cuba, Costa Rica, Honduras, Panama
Warczewiczella guianensis (Lafontaine, G.Gerlach & Senghas) Dressler - Guyana, Suriname, French Guiana
Warczewiczella ionoleuca (Rchb.f.) Schltr. - Colombia, Ecuador
Warczewiczella lipscombiae (Rolfe) Fowlie - Panama
Warczewiczella lobata (Garay) Dressler - Colombia
Warczewiczella marginata Rchb.f. - Panama, Colombia, Venezuela
Warczewiczella palatina (Senghas) Dressler - Peru, Bolivia
Warczewiczella timbiensis P.Ortiz - Colombia
Warczewiczella wailesiana (Lindl.) E.Morren - Brazil

References

 
Zygopetalinae genera
Epiphytic orchids